Camera Chatham Bartolotta is an American politician. A Republican, she is currently the Pennsylvania state Senator for the 46th district.

Biography
Prior to being elected to the Senate in the 2014 election, she opened the first quick-lube business in the Mon Valley, Duke of Oil, and also produced “La Dolce Vita,” a cooking show that aired on WPXI-TV and PCNC. She serves on the Pennsylvania Council on the Arts, Pittsburgh Film Office board of trustees, the Pittsburgh Ballet board of trustees, the University of Pittsburgh Institute of Politics board of fellows, and the Pennsylvania Prison Society board.

Camera Bartolotta represents the 46th Senatorial District which includes residents of Beaver, Greene and Washington counties. She was elected to her first term in 2014, defeating Democratic incumbent Tim Solobay. In doing so, she became the first Republican to represent the 46th district in 38 years, and the first ever woman.

In the Senate, Bartolotta serves as Chair of the Labor & Industry Committee, as well as serving as a member of the Local Government Committee, Rules & Executive Nominations Committee, Transportation Committee, and Veterans Affairs & Emergency Preparedness Committee. She is also a co-chair of the Senate Gas and Oil Caucus, co-founded the bipartisan Criminal Justice Reform Caucus, and founded the Film Industry Caucus, a bicameral group working to support research and analysis of the role that Pennsylvania’s film industry plays in economic development, job creation and revenue enhancement.

She attended Corvallis High School, an all-girls Catholic school in Los Angeles. She earned a Bachelor of Science degree at Saint Mary's College of California.

References

External links

Living people
Actresses from Pennsylvania
Republican Party Pennsylvania state senators
Women state legislators in Pennsylvania
21st-century American politicians
21st-century American women politicians
1963 births